The Eskigümüş rock cut monastery, located off the Kayseri-Niğde road near to the city of Niğde in Turkey, is famed for having what is believed to be the only fresco with a smiling Theotokos.

As the monastery was only recently rediscovered by western Europeans, it was able to escape the vandalism common among many of the churches and monasteries in Cappadoccia. 

The monastery is the farthest south of all of the Cappadocian monasteries. It is located close to the route used by invading Arabs in the 7th century, who traversed the Tarsus Mountains from the south to plunder Kayseri. This route follows the Tarsus River through the rugged Gülek Pass which, known in ancient times as the Cilician Gates was used by Alexander the Great during his eastward campaign into  Persia. 

The plain entrance to the Monastery was designed to shield the complex from passing invaders. This camouflage was so successful that the monastery remained unknown until 1963. High walls surround the large inner courtyard walls with monastic rooms and storage areas. The main church is large and is in extremely good condition, with the many well-preserved frescoes considered to be among the greatest examples of Byzantine art in the region.

See also
Cappadocia;
Underground cities in Avanos
Kaymaklı Underground City
Ihlara Valley
Cappadocian Greek
 Other monasteries;
Sümela Monastery
Kaymaklı Monastery
Monasteries of Mardin
Last House of the Virgin Mary
 Ancient cities;
Ephesus
Demre

External links
Churches
Site with pictures and info

Underground cities
Byzantine monasteries in Turkey
Byzantine churches in Cappadocia
Byzantine sites in Anatolia
Niğde Province
Buildings and structures in Nevşehir Province
Tourist attractions in Nevşehir Province

es:Derinkuyu
tr:Derinkuyu, Nevşehir